Andi LeBeau (formerly Clifford) is an American Democratic politician who served in the Wyoming House of Representatives representing District 33 from 2019 to 2023. Prior to her election, Clifford served as a Fremont County Commissioner.

Elections

2014
After incumbent Democratic Representative Patrick Goggles announced his retirement, Clifford ran for the District 33 seat. She won the Democratic primary with 68% of the vote, but narrowly lost the general election to former Republican representative Jim Allen.

2018
Clifford challenged incumbent Republican Representative Jim Allen and ran unopposed in the Democratic primary election. She narrowly defeated Allen in the general election with 51% of the vote.

References 

Living people
Democratic Party members of the Wyoming House of Representatives
Year of birth missing (living people)
People from Riverton, Wyoming
University of Wyoming alumni
21st-century American politicians
21st-century American women politicians
Women state legislators in Wyoming
Native American state legislators